Janne Sollie (born 27 March 1959) is a Norwegian civil servant.

A sivilagronom by education, she was hired in the Norwegian Pollution Control Authority as a head of department in 1987. From 1990 to 1991 she worked as an advisor in the Ministry of the Environment. She then returned to the Pollution Control Authority, working there until 2001, when she was hired as the first female director of the Norwegian Directorate for Nature Management until its demise.

References

1959 births
Living people
Directors of government agencies of Norway
Norwegian civil servants